The Kodori is one of the two largest rivers of Abkhazia, along with the Bzyb. It is formed by the joining of the rivers Sakeni and Gvandra. It is second after the Bzyb with respect to length at  when combined with the Sakeni.

See also
Kodori Valley for the valley through which the Kodori flows.

References

Caucasus
Rivers of Abkhazia
Rivers of Georgia (country)
Tributaries of the Black Sea